Arable  relates to the growing of crops:
 Arable farming or agronomy, the cultivation of field crops
 Arable land, land upon which crops are cultivated
 Arable crops program, a consolidated support system operated under the EU Common Agricultural Policy
 Fivehead Arable Fields, a Site of Special Scientific Interest in Somerset, England

See also
 Vegetable farming